VIP36-like protein is a protein that in humans is encoded by the LMAN2L gene.

References

Further reading